The Consulate General of the United States is a diplomatic mission of the United States in Peshawar, Pakistan. It operates under the U.S. embassy in Islamabad and serves U.S. consular interests in the Khyber Pakhtunkhwa region. The current consul-general is William Martin, appointed in 2012.

Location
The consulate is located at 11 Hospital Road in the Peshawar Cantonment area.

History
On 5 April 2010, a bombing near the consulate killed 8 people including 2 security personnel, although no Americans were affected. According to reports, the U.S. consulate was the intended target of the attack. On 1 March 2016, two Pakistani employees of the U.S. consulate were killed in an IED blast while involved in a drug-eradication campaign.

Operations
The consulate operates in business hours from Monday to Friday. Key consular sections include political/economic, public affairs, regional security, as well as the Pakistan Deputy Mission Director for Khyber Pakhtunkhwa and FATA.

See also

 Embassy of the United States, Islamabad
 Consulate General of the United States, Karachi
 Consulate General of the United States, Lahore
 Pakistan–United States relations

Notes

References

External links
 Consulate General of the United States, Peshawar

Peshawar
United States
Pakistan–United States relations